The Niue night heron (Nycticorax kalavikai) is an extinct night heron species that was endemic to the island of Niue in West Polynesia.

History
The night heron was described in 2000 from subfossil bones collected in January 1995 by paleozoologist Trevor Worthy at the Anakuli cave site in Hakupu village.  The age range of about 5300 to 3600 year BP for fossil material collected from the site predates human settlement of the island.

Etymology
The specific epithet comes from the Niuean words kalavi (land crab) and kai (food), alluding to speculation by the describers that land crabs constituted an important part of the species' diet.

See also
 List of birds of Niue

References

Extinct birds of Oceania
Nycticorax
Holocene extinctions
Fossil taxa described in 2000
Birds of Niue
Late Quaternary prehistoric birds
Birds described in 2000